The Estadio El Pocito is a multi-use stadium located in Querétaro City, Querétaro. It is currently used mostly for American football matches.  The stadium has a capacity of 4,000 people.

References

Sports venues in Querétaro
College American football venues in Mexico